The Pat O'Donnell & Co. Senior Hurling Championship, more commonly known as the Clare Senior Hurling Championship or Clare SHC, is an annual hurling competition organised by the Clare County Board of the Gaelic Athletic Association. It is contested by the top-ranking senior hurling clubs in Clare, Ireland. It is the most prestigious competition in Clare hurling.

Introduced in 1887 as the Clare Hurling Championship, it was initially a straight knockout tournament open only to senior-ranking club teams. The championship has gone through a number of changes throughout the years, including the use of a round robin, before reverting to a straight knockout format.

In its current format, the Clare Senior Hurling Championship begins once the Clare senior hurling team have concluded their All-Ireland Championship campaign, with seventeen club teams competing in the championship. Six rounds of games are played, culminating with the final match at Cusack Park in October or November that year. The winners of the Clare Senior Hurling Championship qualify for the subsequent Munster Senior Club Hurling Championship, which begins immediately afterwards.

The competition has been won by twenty-three different clubs, nineteen of which have won it more than once. Newmarket-on-Fergus are the most successful club in the championship's history, with twenty-three titles.

Ballyea are the reigning champions and current holders of the Canon Hamilton Cup. In 2022, they defeated their near-neighbours Éire Óg, Ennis by a single point to be crowned champions for the fourth time in seven years.

History

Early beginnings
Following the foundation of the Gaelic Athletic Association in 1884, new rules for gaelic football and hurling were drawn up and published in the United Irishman newspaper. Over the following three years, county committees were established, with the Clare County Board holding their inaugural meeting on 14 February 1887. The inaugural championship in 1887, saw twenty-two clubs competing, with Smith O'Brien's, Killaloe claiming their first and only title. Since then the championship title has been awarded every year except on nine occasions. No championship took place for a five-year period between 1891 and 1895 or in 1901. The early years of the championship was dominated by Tulla winning eight titles, two of which were won by Carahan, who later became the one club. O'Callaghan's Mills (5), Ennis Dalcassians (4), Kilnamona (3), Newmarket-on-Fergus (2), and Scariff (2) were the only other teams to win multiple titles before the championship was suspended from 1920 to 1922 due to civil unrest during the Irish War of Independence.

Post war of independence
Newmarket-on-Fergus (5) and Ennis Dalcassians (4) dominated the period between 1924 and 1934 winning nine titles between them. Feakle claimed five of the ten titles on offer between 1935 and 1944, including a three-in-a-row from 1938 to 1940. The Jimmy Smyth-inspired Ruan won five titles between 1948 and 1962. The next twenty years was again dominated by Newmarket-on-Fergus who returned after a period in the doldrums to claim thirteen titles between 1963 and 1981, including two three-in-a-rows (1963-1965 and 1967–1969), and a historic four-in-a-row from 1971 to 1974. No other club has won more than back-to-back titles since. The remainder of the 20th century saw Sixmilebridge (6) and Clarecastle (5) win eleven titles between them. From 1995-2000 the Clare champions went on to win six consecutive Munster Senior Club Hurling Championships (Clarecastle, Sixmilebridge (2), Doora-Barefield (2), and Wolfe Tones, Shannon) and two All-Ireland Senior Club Hurling Championships (Sixmilebridge and Doora-Barefield).

21st century
In 2007 Tulla ended a seventy-four year wait to win their first title since 1933. The following year Clonlara bridged an eighty-nine year gap from 1919 when then won their second county title. There has also been a number of first-time champions since the turn of the millennium with Ballyea, Cratloe, and Crusheen all having won multiple titles since 2009. Since 2015, Ballyea (4) and Sixmilebridge (4) have shared every title between them but have never met in the county final.

Senior clubs
 The seventeen clubs that will participate in 2023 Clare Senior Hurling Championship are:

Venues

Early rounds

Fixtures in the opening rounds of the championship are usually played at a neutral venue that is deemed halfway between the participating teams. Some of the more common venues include O'Garney Park in Sixmilebridge, Dr Daly Park in Tulla, and Shannon. Cusack Park in Ennis also hosts several double-headers in the early rounds of the championship.

Final
The final is regularly played at Cusack Park in Ennis. Named after the founder of the GAA, Michael Cusack, the ground had an original capacity of about 28,000, but following a 2011 safety review, the certified capacity was reduced to 14,864. In 2015 a major renovation started, this included the demolition and re-erection of the main stand and construction of a new entrance/exit at the north side of the stadium. Once completed in late 2017 the official capacity was increased to 19,000

Winning managers

Trophy
The winning team is presented with the Canon Hamilton Cup. A native of Clonlara, Michael Hamilton (1894-1969) was educated at Clonlara National School and St. Flannan's College in Ennis. He was ordained to the priesthood in Maynooth University in 1919 and later became a professor at St. Flannan's College. In 1922 he became one of the first chaplains in the Irish Army. Hamilton was a noted hurler in his youth and was chairman of the Clare County Board for over twenty-five years. He died while attending the Newmarket-on-Fergus and Clarecastle county final replay on 31 August 1969.

Roll of honour

List of finals

 Brian Boru's were another temporary amalgamation that was composed of the Bodyke, Killanena and Tulla clubs in 1975. They competed together at senior level when they were all competing at either intermediate or junior level individually. Brian Boru's won the 1975 senior county title defeating Éire Óg, Ennis in the final.
 St Brendan's were an temporary amalgamation of the Kilmaley and Doora-Barefield clubs in 1979. St Brendan's contested the 1979 county final, losing out to Sixmilebridge.

Records and statistics

Consecutive championships
 4-in-a-row:
 Once by  Newmarket-on-Fergus (1971-1974)
 3-in-a-row:
 Three times by  Newmarket-on-Fergus (1925-1927), (1963-1965), and (1967-1969)
 Once by  Feakle (1938-1940)

"The Double"
The following clubs have won both the Clare Senior Hurling Championship and Clare Senior Football Championship in the same year:
 Four times by  Ennis Dalcassians (1890, 1911, 1914, 1929)
 Once by  Cratloe (2014)

By decade
The most successful team of each decade, judged by number of Clare Senior Hurling Championship titles they won, is as follows:
 1880s: One title each for  Smith O'Brien's, Killaloe (1887),  Ogonnelloe (1888) &  Tulla (1889)
 1890s: Three titles for  Tulla (1896, 1897, 1899)
 1900s: Three titles each for  Kilnamona (1902, 1903, 1908) &  O'Callaghan's Mills (1904, 1906, 1909)
 1910s: Three titles for  Ennis Dalcassians (1911, 1914, 1915)
 1920s: Three titles each for  Newmarket-on-Fergus (1925, 1926, 1927) &  Ennis Dalcassians (1924, 1928 (with Clarecastle), 1929)
 1930s: Three titles each for  Newmarket-on-Fergus (1930, 1931, 1936) &  Feakle (1935, 1938, 1939) 
 1940s: Three titles for  Clarecastle (1943, 1945, 1949)
 1950s: Two titles each for  Scariff (1952, 1953),  Éire Óg (1956, 1957),  St. Joseph's, Doora-Barefield (1954, 1958) &  Ruan (1951, 1959)
 1960s: Six titles for  Newmarket-on-Fergus (1963, 1964, 1965, 1967, 1968, 1969)
 1970s: Six titles for  Newmarket-on-Fergus (1971, 1972, 1973, 1974, 1976, 1978)
 1980s: Three titles for  Sixmilebridge (1983, 1984, 1989)
 1990s: Three titles each for  Sixmilebridge (1992, 1993, 1995) &  Clarecastle (1991, 1994, 1997) 
 2000s: Two titles each for  Sixmilebridge (2000, 2002) &  Clarecastle (2003, 2005) 
 2010s: Four titles for  Sixmilebridge (2013, 2015, 2017, 2019)
 2020s: Two titles for  Ballyea (2021, 2022)

Barren spells
The longest gaps between successive Clare Senior Hurling Championship titles are:
 89 years:  Clonlara (1919-2008)
 74 years:  Tulla (1933-2007)
 44 years:  Feakle (1944-1988)
 40 years:  St. Joseph's, Doora-Barefield (1958-1998)
 31 years:  Newmarket-on-Fergus (1981-2012)
 29 years:  Scariff (1917-1946)
 21 years:  Ennis Dalcassians (1890-1911) &  Clarecastle (1949-1970)
 20 years:  Tulla (1913-1933)
 19 years:  O'Callaghan's Mills (1918-1937),  Newmarket-on-Fergus (1936-1955) &  Kilmaley (1985-2004)
 16 years:  Clarecastle (1970-1986)
 14 years:  Éire Óg, Ennis (1966-1980)
 11 years:  Whitegate (1950-1961) &  Sixmilebridge (2002-2013)
 10 years:  Scariff (1907-1917),  Wolfe Tones, Shannon (1996-2006)

See also
 Clare Intermediate Hurling Championship
 Clare Junior A Hurling Championship
 Clare Under-21 A Hurling Championship

References

External links
 Official Clare Website
 Clare on Hoganstand
 Clare Club GAA

 
1
Senior hurling county championships